At least two ships of the Hellenic Navy have borne the name Lonchi ("lance"):

  a  launched in 1907 and scrapped in 1931.
  a  launched in 1942 as USS Hall transferred to Greece in 1960 and renamed. She was scrapped in 1997.

Hellenic Navy ship names